Guido Memo (died 1438) was a Roman Catholic prelate who served as Bishop of Verona (1409–1438).

Biography
On 29 November 1409, Guido Memo was appointed during the papacy of Pope Gregory XII as Bishop of Verona. He served as Bishop of Verona until his death in 1438.

References

External links and additional sources
 (for Chronology of Bishops) 
 (for Chronology of Bishops) 

15th-century English Roman Catholic bishops
Bishops appointed by Pope Gregory XII
1438 deaths